Statistics of Nadeshiko.League in the 2007 season. Nippon TV Beleza won the championship.

Division 1

Result

League awards

Best player

Top scorers

Best eleven

Best young player

Division 2

Result 

 Best Player: Aya Sameshima, TEPCO Mareeze

Promotion/relegation series

Division 1 promotion/relegation series 

 Iga FC Kunoichi Stay Division 1 in 2008 Season.
 JEF United Chiba Ladies Stay Division 2 in 2008 Season.

See also 
 Empress's Cup

External links 
  Nadeshiko League Official Site
 Season at soccerway.com

Nadeshiko League seasons
1
L
Japan
Japan